Swe Li Myint (born June 24, 1993) is a Burmese middle-distance runner. She competed at the 2016 Summer Olympics in the women's 800 metres race; her time of 2:16.98 in the heats did not qualify her for the semifinals.

References

External links
 

1993 births
Living people
Burmese female middle-distance runners
Olympic athletes of Myanmar
Athletes (track and field) at the 2010 Summer Youth Olympics
Athletes (track and field) at the 2016 Summer Olympics
Southeast Asian Games medalists in athletics
Southeast Asian Games silver medalists for Myanmar
Southeast Asian Games bronze medalists for Myanmar
Competitors at the 2013 Southeast Asian Games
Competitors at the 2015 Southeast Asian Games
Competitors at the 2017 Southeast Asian Games